The Randolph Street Bridge is a bridge that crosses the Chicago River in downtown Chicago, Illinois.

References

External links
 
 Rush for Life Over the Randolph Street Bridge (Chicago In Flames), Encyclopedia of Chicago (Chicago Historical Society)

Bascule bridges in the United States
Bridges completed in 1984
Bridges in Chicago